Uručča (also referred to as Uruchcha or Uruch'ye) (lit. 'Brookside') is a Minsk Metro station, a terminus of the Maskoŭskaja line. Opened on November 7, 2007 it is the first station outside the Minsk Automobile Ring Road, located in the Uručča ('Brookside') microraion of Minsk's Metropolitan Borough of Pershamayski. 

The station is shallow, in a pillar by-span design. As with all the recently built metro stations in Minsk, it has disabled access. The station is in the middle of the Uručča microraion on the northeastern edge of the city, with numerous connections to provincial bus routes and to Minsk International Airport.

Gallery

References

External links
  Unofficial site

Minsk Metro stations
Railway stations opened in 2007